Piano Circus is the first album by the piano ensemble Piano Circus. It was released by Argo Records in 1992.

Track listing
It consists of four tracks:
 Chris Fitkin -- Sextet (6.58)
 Michael Nyman -- 1-100 (21.59)
 Tim Seddon -- 16 (4:41)
 Simon Rackham -- Which ever way your nose bends (31.04)

Total running time: 65.02

Personnel
Kirsteen Davidson-Kelly
Richard Harris
Kate Heath
Max Richter
Ginny Strawson
Michael Haslam (track 1)
John Wood (tracks 2-4)

Recorded for Argo by Another Complete Fabrication at The Mill, Cookham, in April 1990, and at Surrey Sound, Leatherhead, in April 1991 ("Sextet")

Producer: Andrew Cornall
Publisher: Kelly Music (1-100)
Art Direction: David Smart
Design: Russell Warren-Fischer
Photography: Malcolm Heyood, Alan Fox, Robert Willis
Catalog number 433-522-2

1992 classical albums